Between Friends is an American musical group, composed of siblings Brandon and Savannah Hudson. In 2013, they were quarterfinalists on Season 8 of America's Got Talent. The duo continued to pursue music, forming Between Friends in 2017, and released their first  EP in 2018. As of February 2023, they have nearly 2,000,000 monthly listeners on Spotify.

Biography
The duo were born in Miami, Florida, and grew up in Laurel Canyon, Los Angeles. They displayed an early interest and aptitude for music, and were home-schooled. In 2013, they auditioned for Season 8 of America's Got Talent, and progressed until being eliminated in the quarterfinals. Two years later they, along with several others, formed a group called The Heirs. They played in the 2016 Vans Warped Tour, but the group disbanded in 2017. The duo, along with the drummer of The Heirs, split off to create Between Friends in 2017. They are especially known for their 2018 hit single "affection", which has more than 155 million streams on Spotify as of February 2023. Their style has been self-described as "laptop-dream pop".

Discography

Albums
 2021 - i like when you shine!

EPs
 2018 - we just need some time together
 2021 - tape 001
 2021 - tape 002
 2021 - tape 003
 2022 - CUTiE

References

American musical groups